Luke Folwell (born 15 May 1987) is a British artistic gymnast and coach from Northampton. In October 2010 he won five medals for England in the gymnastics at the 2010 Commonwealth Games to become the most successful British gymnast in a single Games in Commonwealth Games history. His feat was matched by Max Whitlock in 2014, and Nile Wilson in 2018, and bettered by Welsh rhythmic gymnast Francesca Jones in 2014 who won 6 medals.

References

External links
 
  (2006)
  (2010)

1987 births
Living people
British male artistic gymnasts
English male artistic gymnasts
Commonwealth Games gold medallists for England
Commonwealth Games silver medallists for England
Commonwealth Games bronze medallists for England
Commonwealth Games medallists in gymnastics
Gymnasts at the 2010 Commonwealth Games
Sportspeople from Northampton
People from Huntingdon
21st-century British people
Medallists at the 2006 Commonwealth Games
Medallists at the 2010 Commonwealth Games